Ronald Lionel Dias (February 15, 1937 – July 30, 2013) was an American animator and painter who began his career in 1956 after winning a stamp animation contest organized jointly by the U.S. Post Office, the U.S. Office of Education and Counsel of Chief State Schools' officers. He contributed to films such as The Secret of NIMH, The Chipmunk Adventure and Who Framed Roger Rabbit. He died on July 30, 2013.

References

External links 

1937 births
2013 deaths
American animators
American male painters